GCOS may refer to:
Affymetrix GeneChip Operating Software
Global Climate Observing System
General Comprehensive Operating System, a family of operating systems oriented toward mainframes, originally called GECOS (General Electric Comprehensive Operating Supervisor)

See also 
 GKOS keyboard
 Geckos
 GameCube OS A homebrew Operating System for the Nintendo Gamecube and later Nintendo Wii
 Google Chrome Operating System An open source, lightweight operating system that will initially be targeted at netbooks
 General Cargo Operational SystemTransnet Port Terminals Operational System in house built (GCOS)

pl:GECOS